Gabaa may refer to:

 Gabâ, the concept of divine retribution in parts of the Philippines

GABAA may refer to:
 GABAA receptor

See also 
 Gaaba, an Indian dish prepared from taro leaves
 Gaba (disambiguation)
 Gabba (disambiguation)